Pistoleta (fl. 1185–1228) was a Provençal troubadour. His name (actually a nickname) means "little letter (epistle)" in Occitan. He left behind eleven songs, comprising nine cansos and two tensos. Some of his pieces are assigned to an otherwise unknown Jordan de Born in the table of contents of chansonnier C, a fourteenth-century Occitan manuscript.

According to his vida, he was a cantaire (singer) of Arnaut de Maruoill, which probably implies that he was a jongleur who sang Arnaut's songs or perhaps acted as a messenger to bring his songs from one place to another both orally and in writing. He may have carried Arnaut's love songs to the "Countess of Burlatz"; this would explain his nickname. If the vida be correct about Pistoleta's early career, then he was probably a jongleur from about 1195 or perhaps as early as 1185 and only began his own composing career around 1205.

Five of Pistoleta's songs contain references to the King of Aragon, usually presumed to be Peter II. From this it can be deduced that he spent some time at Peter's court, but he also addressed the king in at least one poem, from far away. He is also said to have had relations with Ebles V of Ventadorn, Thomas I of Savoy, and Blacas III of Aulps. In his youth he may have travelled into Limousin and Languedoc and met Maria de Ventadorn, Ebles' wife. He composed a tenso with the latter, which has been dated to late 1228, making it his last known work and the only known work by Maria.

Sometime after October 1214 Pistoleta wrote , which was something of a planh, since it mourns the passing of Peter II and Alfonso VIII of Castile in 1213 and 1214 respectively:
{|
|
Pueis lo reis d'Aragon
muric ni.l reis N'Anfos,e si per leis non foscui sobr'altras res blan,non chantera ugan.|
Since the king of Aragon
and the king Lord Alfonso died,
and it will not be for them
who above others are pleasant,
I will not sing this year.
|}
Sometime after composing this song, probably in Languedoc or Catalonia (Pistoleta implies perhaps visiting Perpignan), where Peter and Alfonso were frequently active, Pistoleta returned east of the Rhône to Provence.

Though Pistoleta's biographer implies that "graceful melodies" (lit. pleasing sounds) were typical of his work, only one melody has survived (for his popular and well-preserved sirventes beginning ) and that in two different versions. His composing was very conservative, more so than his master, Arnaut. Though well-esteemed by "high society", he was a poor conversationalist and unpleasant in appearance. He eventually settled down in Marseille, took a wife, and became a merchant, acquiring considerable wealth which allowed him to stop his itinerant "court-hopping". Unfortunately, there is no corroborating documentation for anything contained in Pistoleta's vida.

Pistoleta also wrote two tensos with two trobairitz (female troubadour):  ("Good lady, I beg you to advise me") with an anonymous lady and the aforementioned piece with Maria de Ventadorn.

Sources

Aubrey, Elizabeth. The Music of the Troubadours. Indiana University Press, 1996. .
Egan, Margarita, ed. and trans. The Vidas of the Troubadours. New York: Garland, 1984. .
Jeanroy, Alfred. La poésie lyrique des troubadours. Toulouse: Privat, 1934.
Riquer, Martín de. Los trovadores: historia literaria y textos''. 3 vol. Barcelona: Planeta, 1975.

Notes

12th-century French troubadours
13th-century French troubadours
People from Provence